Local elections were held in Taytay, Rizal on Monday, May 9, 2022, as a part of the 2022 Philippine general election. Voters will select candidates for all local positions: a town mayor, vice mayor and town councilors, as well as members of the Sangguniang Panlalawigan, a governor, a vice-governor and a representative for the province's first congressional district in the House of Representatives.

The town's election turnout is 84.6%, (218 of 218 election returns) equivalent to 129,437 of 152,994 total registered voters. Barangay Dolores chairman Allan De Leon won the mayoral race against Outgoing Mayor Joric Gacula. Councilor Pia Cabral won the vice mayoralty race against Outgoing Vice mayor Mitch Bermundo, and Vice mayoral aspirant Eljun Victor.

Background
In the 2019 election, Joric Gacula was re-elected to a second term as mayor defeating then vice mayor Bonoy Gonzaga. His running mate, Mitch Bermundo was elected to her first term as vice mayor under Gacula defeating Gonzaga's running mate then councilor JV cabitac.

Outgoing mayor George Ricardo II Reyes "Joric" Gacula is seeking re-election for a third and final term. Gacula served as mayor from 2004 to 2013, which totals to six terms if elected as mayor. His main opponent is Barangay Dolores chairman Allan Martine Singcuenco De Leon.

During the campaign period of the 2022 election, President Rodrigo Duterte endorsed Allan De Leon and Pia Cabral for mayor and vice mayor respectively. Duterte said that they helped him win during his presidential campaign, and he wants to repay the favor.

Allan De Leon, and Pia Cabral together with the winning candidates on the Sangguniang Bayan election are proclaimed as winners of the 2022 Taytay local elections shortly after election day. Outgoing mayor Joric Gacula then accepted the results and said that he "Would leave things up to the Lord," and thanked Taytayeños who supported and helped him in his five terms as Mayor.

Candidates

Administration coalition

Primary opposition coalition

Other candidates

Non-independents not in tickets

Independents not in Tickets

Results

Mayoral election 

Incumbent mayor Joric Gacula is seeking re-election for a third and final term against Barangay Dolores Chairman Allan De Leon.

By barangay

Vice mayoral election 

Incumbent vice mayor Mitch Bermundo is seeking re-election for a second term against Councilor Pia Cabral, and vice mayoral aspirant Eljun Victor.

By barangay

Sangguniang Bayan election
Election is via plurality-at-large voting: A voter votes for up to eight candidates, then the eight candidates with the highest number of votes are elected.

|-bgcolor=black
|colspan=25|

References

2022 Philippine local elections
May 2022 events in the Philippines
Elections in Taytay, Rizal
2022 elections in Calabarzon